Jambuswami (543-449 BCE) was the spiritual successor of Sudharmaswami in Jain religious order reorganised by Mahavira. He remained the head for 39 or 44 years, after which he is believed to have gained Kevala Jnana (omniscience). He is believed to be the third and last kevali (omniscient being) after Mahavira in Jain tradition. He is believed to have attained moksha (liberated) at the age of 84 in Mathura.

Jambu was succeeded by Prabhava (443-338 BCE), who was converted from a bandit by him. Prabhava was succeeded by Shayyambhava (377-315 BCE). Shayyambhava composed Dasavaikalika sutra after studying the fourteen purvas (pre-canonical texts). He was initiated as a Jain monk. He initiated his son as a monk at the age of eight and taught him sacred knowledge in 10 lectures in six months after which the latter died.

Shayyambhava was succeeded by Yasobhadra (351-235 BCE), who was succeeded by his two disciples, Sambhutavijaya (347-257 BCE) and Bhadrabahu (322-243 BCE).

References

Citations

Sources
 
 
 

Jain saints